"Show Me Your Soul" is a song by the funk rock band Red Hot Chili Peppers that was recorded in 1990 and produced by John Norwood Fisher of Fishbone and features Billy Preston on keyboard. It was not, as is commonly believed, recorded during the Mother's Milk sessions. However, it was recorded during the first part of the Mother's Milk tour. "Show Me Your Soul" was recorded for the soundtrack of the film Pretty Woman, and was shortly after released as the B-side to "Taste the Pain" in the US and UK. In Australia, it appeared as the B-side to the belated 1990 release of "Knock Me Down". Both singles credit the song as coming from the Pretty Woman soundtrack. A promo only single was released to promote the soundtrack and it is thought that it was meant to be a full single until a last minute change of plan. This peaked at number ten on the Modern Rock Tracks chart. The track was later included as the sole exclusive track on the 1992 compilation album What Hits!?.

There was a music video made for the song, which features the band in front of a Bluescreen. The video was directed by Bill Stobaugh, and edited by Scott C. Wilson. It was released on February 14, 1990, and also appears on the What Hits!? VHS/DVD and the 1993 Beavis and Butt-Head episode "Sign Here".

The song has never been performed live by the band, although they did once lip sync it for "Save the Planet", a TV special on April 4, 1990.

Track listing
12-inch and CD promo single (1990)
 "Show Me Your Soul"

Personnel
Red Hot Chili Peppers
 Anthony Kiedis – lead vocals
 Flea – bass, backing vocals
 John Frusciante – guitar, backing vocals
 Chad Smith – drums

Additional musicians
 Billy Preston – keyboards

Charts

References

Red Hot Chili Peppers songs
1990 singles
Songs written for films
Songs written by Flea (musician)
Songs written by John Frusciante
Songs written by Anthony Kiedis
Songs written by Chad Smith
1990 songs